The Battle of Río de Oro was a single-ship action fought in August 1914 during the First World War, when  attacked the German  off Río de Oro on the coast of Northwest Africa.

Background 
Under the command of Max Reymann, Imperial German Navy ship  was originally a passenger liner, built in 1897, part of the German merchant fleet until requisitioned for service at the outbreak of World War I and fitted with six 4-inch guns and two 37-millimeter guns. The German vessel set steam for a commerce raiding mission in the Atlantic Ocean.

Commanded by Henry T. Buller, Royal Navy ship  was a protected cruiser built in 1898 with eleven 6-inch guns, nine 12-pounder guns, six 3-pounder guns and two torpedo tubes. She had been detached to support the 5th Cruiser Squadron in hunting the German raider.

Battle 

The battle of 26 August 1914 began when the German raider Kaiser Wilhelm der Grosse was caught by surprise in a harbour, taking on coal from three German and Austro-Hungarian colliers. Highflyer, greatly outgunning the German auxiliary cruiser, first demanded surrender, but the German commander argued that the British had violated Spain's neutrality.

The British disregarded this because the Germans had already violated Spain's neutrality by taking over a week to resupply in a neutral port. So a battle began: from 15:10 to 16:45 the two ships bombarded each other, sometimes dodging the shots. Eventually, Kaiser Wilhelm der Grosse exhausted her ammunition and sought to flee the battle. The crew then scuttled the ship, made it to shore and escaped into the Saharan Desert.

Aftermath 

British sources at the time insisted the German auxiliary cruiser was sunk by Highflyers crew but eventually stories from the surviving German seamen began to circulate, thus ending Britain's claim. Regardless of whether the ship was sunk by the British or scuttled by the Germans, the British were still responsible for the raider's demise.

Kaiser Wilhelm der Grosse became the first passenger liner to sink during World War I. The wreck of the German commerce raider was identifiable because its starboard side remained above the waterline until the ship was scrapped in 1952. One British soldier was killed in the battle and six others were wounded. German casualties are unknown.

See also 
 Battle of Trindade

References

Further reading

External links 

 The Great Ocean Liners: Kaiser Wilhelm der Grosse
 Lostliners: Kaiser Wilhelm der Grosse
 Maritimequest Kaiser Wilhelm der Grosse photo gallery

Conflicts in 1914
Naval battles of World War I involving Germany
Naval battles of World War I involving the United Kingdom
Atlantic operations of World War I
1914 in Spanish Sahara
August 1914 events
Germany–United Kingdom military relations